The Crisis Management and Planning Directorate (CMPD) is body within the European Union's (EU) External Action Service (EEAS) that is in charge of the integrated civilian-military planning within the sphere of the Common Security and Defence Policy (CSDP).

See also
High Representative
Common Security and Defence Policy
Structure of the Common Security and Defence Policy
European Union Military Staff
Military Planning and Conduct Capability
Civilian Planning and Conduct Capability

References

External links

Common Security and Defence Policy bodies of the European External Action Service